Hans Kloss (12 July 1938 – 12 September 2018) was a German artist and graphic designer. He is best known for his large paintings combining medieval and modern styles.

Early life 
Kloss was born in Ohlau, Silesia, on 12 July 1938. He trained as a ceramics painter, and studied at the Fachschule für Gestaltung in Schwäbisch Gmünd, a town in the eastern part of Baden-Württemberg, where he settled in 1953. In 1969 he moved to the neighboring town of Lorch, where he has resided since.

Work 
Kloss' most famous work is his Staufer-Rundbild, a panoramic painting depicting in great detail the history of the House of Hohenstaufen, a powerful ruling house in the 12th and 13th centuries. He started the painting in 1997, and completed it in 2002, the 900th anniversary of the monastery. Starting in 2012, Kloss was working on a new 47 square meter Staufersaga-Panorama, which he completed in 2015.
It can be seen in the new Panoramamuseum Schwäbisch Gmünd.

A monumental altar of his, in the style of Jerg Ratgeb, was bought by the Sammlung Würth in 2004.

For his work, Kloss has received the Premio Internazionale Federichino of Iesi, Italy in 2004; the Staufermedaille of the state of Baden-Württemberg in 2005; and the Irenen-Preis of the Freundeskreis Königin Irene Maria von Byzanz e.V. of Göppingen in 2003.

Personal life 
Kloss was formerly married to Maria Kloss, a fellow painter. Kloss was a member of the Social Democratic Party, and was a member of Lorch's municipal council, starting in the late 1970s. He was part of the administration and finance committee. He left the council in 2009, saying he was disappointed about the lack of estimation of his work.

References

Further reading

External links 

 

1938 births
2018 deaths
German artists
German graphic designers
People from the Province of Silesia
People from Oława